Willy Sommer (15 February 1925 – 9 July 2001) was a Swiss football striker and later manager.

References

1925 births
2001 deaths
Swiss men's footballers
FC Solothurn players
Association football forwards
Swiss football managers
FC Solothurn managers
FC Fribourg managers
FC Winterthur managers
FC St. Gallen managers
FC Lugano managers
FC Wettingen managers